The 1921 VFL Grand Final was an Australian rules football game contested between the Carlton Football Club and Richmond Football Club, held at the Melbourne Cricket Ground in Melbourne on 15 October 1921. It was the 24th annual Grand Final of the Victorian Football League, staged to determine the premiers for the 1921 VFL season. The match, attended by 43,122 spectators, was won by Richmond by a margin of 4 points, marking that club's second VFL/AFL premiership victory and second in succession.

Score

Teams

 Umpire - Jack McMurray

Statistics

Goalkickers

References
AFL Tables: 1921 Grand Final

See also
 1921 VFL season

VFL/AFL Grand Finals
Grand
Richmond Football Club
Carlton Football Club
October 1921 sports events